Amarsi un po (English: "To Love a Little") is a 1984 Italian romantic comedy film co-written and directed by Carlo Vanzina.

Plot   
Cristiana is a young and beautiful princess in Rome, bored by her life and her traditional parents. Marco is a young electrician and the son of a news agent. The two meet due to a minor car accident; they like each other and decide to be together despite the differences in class. Soon a great love is born, but in the long run the misunderstandings due to the different social background prevail: on the occasion of a holiday with some friends of the girl, the differences in style and behavior are highlighted, also due to the presence of an old flame of Cristiana.

The two break up, and she plans a wedding with the wealthy French nobleman Felix Rothschild. But the love between Marco and Cristiana did not fade or die. Marco, having learned of Cristiana's imminent wedding, leaves by car from Rome to Paris; he falls asleep while driving and collides with a truck. Meanwhile, Cristiana gets married but when she is departing for her honeymoon, she reads in the newspaper about Marco's accident, leaves her husband and goes to the hospital, choosing to return to the boy.

Cast 
Claudio Amendola: Marco Coccia
Tahnee Welch: Princess Cristiana Cellini
Virna Lisi: Princess Marisa Cellini
Riccardo Garrone: Prince Cellini 
: Prince Ugo Cellini
Mario Brega: Augusto Coccia
Rossana Di Lorenzo: Maria Coccia
: The neighbor
: marquis Ludovico Brunelli
: marchesina Brunelli
Nicoletta Elmi: Amanda Orselli
Mario Brega: Augusto Coccia
Rossana Di Lorenzo: Maria Coccia
: Micione

See also     
 List of Italian films of 1984

References

External links

1984 films
Italian romantic comedy films
1984 romantic comedy films
Films directed by Carlo Vanzina
1980s Italian-language films
1980s Italian films